The Oberhalbstein Alps or Platta Group are a mountain range in the Alps of eastern Switzerland and northern Italy. They are considered to be part of the Central Eastern Alps. The Oberhalbstein Alps are separated from the Lepontine Alps in the west by the Splügen Pass; from the Plessur Alps in the north by the river Albula; from the Albula Alps in the east by the Septimer Pass and the river Gelgia; from the Bernina Range in the south by the Val Bregaglia.

The Oberhalbstein Alps are drained by the rivers Hinterrhein, Gelgia, Liro and Mera.

Peaks

The main peaks of the Oberhalbstein Alps are:

Passes
The main mountain passes of the Oberhalbstein Alps are:

See also
Swiss Alps
List of mountain groups in the Alpine Club classification of the Eastern Alps

References
Swisstopo maps

Mountain ranges of the Alps
Central Alps
Rhaetian Alps
Mountain ranges of Switzerland
Mountain ranges of Italy
Mountain ranges of Graubünden
Limestone Alps